Neodorcadion exornatum is a species of beetle in the family Cerambycidae. It was described by Frivaldsky in 1835. It is known from Romania, Greece, Bulgaria, and Turkey. It contains the varietas Neodorcadion exornatum var. balcanicum.

References

Dorcadiini
Beetles described in 1835